John A. Miller (born August John Mueller; 1872 – June 24, 1941) was an American roller coaster designer and builder, inventor, and businessman. Miller patented over 100 key roller coaster components, and is widely considered the "father of the modern high-speed roller coaster." During his lifetime, he participated in the design of approximately 150 coasters and was a key business partner and mentor to other well-known roller coaster designers, Harry C. Baker and John C. Allen.

Biography

Early life
Miller was born in Homewood, Illinois and worked as a coaster builder at a very early age. At the age of 19, he started working with La Marcus Thompson and went on to serve as Thompson's chief engineer. By 1911, he was working as a consultant to the Philadelphia Toboggan Company He also worked with noted designers Frederick Ingersoll and Fred and Josiah Pearce.

Miller in 1910 designed a device that prevented cars from rolling backward down the lift hill in the event of pull chain breakage. It attached to the track and clicked onto the rungs of the chain. Known as the safety chain dog, or safety ratchet, it evolved into the device on the underside of cars that makes that distinctive  sound of wooden coasters.

Miller's most important contribution to roller coaster technology, though, was the underfriction wheel. In 1919, he patented the "Miller Under Friction Wheel," also called the "upstop wheel," which consisted of a wheel that ran under the track to keep the coaster cars from flying off. This allowed the designers to use very steep drops, sharp horizontal and vertical curves and high speeds. These are found on nearly every roller coaster in operation.

Miller & Baker
Besides patenting ingenious inventions for coasters—including several types of brakes and car bar locks—Miller built his share of unusual "scream machines." In 1920 Miller went into business with Harry C. Baker as "Miller & Baker, Inc." and over the next three years, they built popular coasters all over North America. Characteristics of their roller coasters are camelback hills (multiple straight or slightly angled drops that went all the way to the ground) and large, flat turns.

Miller & Baker built other types of amusement rides and structures as well. In addition to coasters, the firm constructed mill chutes, and domed roof buildings for carousels and dance pavilions.

The John Miller Company
After 1923, Miller continued to design and build coasters for his own company, "The John Miller Company." The Dip-Lo-Docus (c. 1923), billed as "The Jazz Ride," featured revolving three-seater cars, whereas the Flying Turns (1929) consisted of cars with swiveling rubber wheels tearing through a half-cylindrical chute like a toboggan. The legendary Cyclone (1928–1958) at Puritas Springs near Cleveland, Ohio was honored with a place on the Smithsonian Institution's list of Great Lost Roller Coasters. It was hidden so much by foliage that only the boarding platform was visible to riders before they began to race through the ravine. This 1928 ride was considered one of the golden-age classics of the period.

Later life and death
Although many of his most famous roller coasters were built during the 1920s, Miller never stopped building roller coasters. He continued to travel to supervise site installations and consult on roller coaster design until his death. He died on June 24, 1941, while working on a roller coaster project at Playland Park in Houston, Texas, at the age of 69. He is interred in the Homewood Memorial Gardens in Homewood, IL.

Roller coasters

During his lifetime, Miller designed or contributed to the design of approximately 150 roller coasters.

Patents

References

External links

John A. Miller site

Amusement ride manufacturers
Roller coaster designers
People from Homewood, Illinois
1872 births
1941 deaths